Anne Woods may refer to:

Anne Woods Patterson
Anne Woods (gurner), world gurning champion 28 times
Holly Woods, real name Anne Woods

See also
Ann Wood (disambiguation)